Conan may refer to:

People
 Saint Conan (died 684), bishop of the Isle of Man
 Conan of Cornwall (c. 930 – c. 950), bishop of Cornwall
 Conan I of Rennes (died 992), duke of Brythonic Brittany
 Conan II, Duke of Brittany (died 1066), duke of Brittany
 Conan III, Duke of Brittany (died 1148), duke of Brittany
 Conan IV, Duke of Brittany (1138–1171), duke of Brittany
 Laure Conan (1845–1924), pen name of Marie-Louise-Félicité Angers, French-Canadian female novelist
 Neal Conan (1949–2021), American radio journalist
 Conan Anthony Mohan Jayamaha (1949–1992), Sri Lankan Sinhala Navy Admiral
 Conan Byrne, (born 1985), Irish footballer
Conan Gray (born 1998), American singer-songwriter, YouTuber and social media personality
 Conan O'Brien (born 1963), American talk show host
 Conan Stevens, Australian actor, writer, stuntman and former professional wrestler
Arthur Conan Doyle (1859–1930), British writer

Mythical and legendary people
 Conan Meriadoc, Brythonic king of Dumnonia (Cornwall, Brittany)
 Conán mac Morna, fian warrior
 Conán mac Lia, fian warrior and son of Liath Luachra
 Conand (mythology), Fomorian leader

Characters
 Conan the Barbarian, a character created by Robert E. Howard, appearing in many different media
 Conan the Librarian, a perennial parody of Robert E. Howard's Conan the Barbarian that has appeared in many different media
 Conan Edogawa, pseudonym of Jimmy Kudo, the protagonist of the manga franchise Detective Conan
 Admiral Conan Antonio Motti, a Star Wars character
 Captain Conan in the book of the same name, and the Capitaine Conan movie on which it is based

Video games
 Conan: Hall of Volta, 1984 video game for PC-88, Apple II, Atari 8-bit and Commodore 64
 Conan: The Mysteries of Time, also known as Myth: History in the Making, a 1991 video game
 Conan (2004 video game), for the PC and Xbox, GameCube, and PS2 consoles
 Conan (2007 video game), for the Xbox 360 and PS3 consoles
 Age of Conan: Unchained, 2008 video game
 Conan Exiles, 2018 survival video game

Pen and paper games
 Conan Unchained! and Conan Against Darkness!, two 1984 pen-and-paper role-playing game supplement adventures for the Dungeons & Dragons roleplaying game system
 Conan Role-Playing Game, 1985 pen-and-paper role-playing game from TSR, using a different system than the 1984 supplements
 GURPS Conan, a 1988–1989 line of supplement adventures for the GURPS pen-and-paper role-playing game system, published by Steve Jackson Games
 Conan: The Roleplaying Game, a 2004 pen-and-paper role-playing game, by Mongoose Publishing
 Conan: Adventures in an Age Undreamed Of, 2017 pen-and-paper role-playing game, by the Modiphius Entertainment

Television
Conan (talk show), American late night talk show hosted by Conan O'Brien
Future Boy Conan, a 1978 anime series
Conan the Adventurer (1992 TV series), American-French-Canadian animated television series
Conan and the Young Warriors, 1994 American animated television series
Detective Conan, an ongoing anime series starting in 1996 based on the long-running manga of the same name
Conan the Adventurer (1997 TV series), aka Conan, an American television series starring Ralf Möller

Films
 Conan the Barbarian (1982 film), based on the character created by Robert E. Howard
 Conan the Destroyer (1984), a sequel to the 1982 film, Conan the Barbarian 
 Conan the Barbarian (2011 film), a reboot of the Conan films
 The Legend of Conan, a sequel proposed in 2012 to the 1982 film Conan the Barbarian

Books and comics
 The Constitution of the United States of America: Analysis and Interpretation (CONAN), popularly known as the Constitution Annotated
 Conan (books), stories and books by Robert E. Howard and others
 Conan (collection), a collection of short stories
 Conan (comics), comics adaptations of the Robert E. Howard origination
 Conan (Marvel Comics), titles published by Marvel from 1970
 Conan (Dark Horse Comics), numerous comics published by Dark Horse from 2003

Computing
 Conan package manager, a C/C++ package manager.

Other uses
 Conan, Loir-et-Cher, France
 Conan (band), a doom metal band from Liverpool, UK, founded in 2006
 Conan (dog), a military working dog that participated in the Barisha raid, which resulted in the death of ISIS leader Abu Bakr al-Baghdadi

See also
 Aurelius Conanus, legendary King of the Britons
 Conan the Adventurer (disambiguation)
 Conan the Barbarian (disambiguation)
 Conan the Cimmerian (disambiguation)
 Conan the Conqueror (disambiguation)
 Conan the Destroyer (disambiguation)
 Conan of Cimmeria (disambiguation)
 Conand (disambiguation)
 Connan, a surname
 Conon (disambiguation)
 Konan (disambiguation)